Evaniella is a genus of ensign wasps in the family Evaniidae. There are more than 70 described species in Evaniella.

Species
These 76 species belong to the genus Evaniella:

 Evaniella albispina (Cameron, 1887)
 Evaniella alticola (Kieffer, 1910)
 Evaniella areolata (Schletterer, 1889)
 Evaniella bakeriana (Kieffer, 1910)
 Evaniella barbata (Frison, 1922)
 Evaniella bella (Frison, 1922)
 Evaniella bifurcata (Kieffer, 1910)
 Evaniella boliviana (Strand, 1912)
 Evaniella brachystylus (Schletterer, 1889)
 Evaniella brevidens (Kieffer, 1910)
 Evaniella brevigena (Kieffer, 1904)
 Evaniella calcarata (Schletterer, 1889)
 Evaniella californica (Ashmead, 1901)
 Evaniella cameroni Bradley, 1908
 Evaniella carinulata (Schletterer, 1889)
 Evaniella cerviculata (Frison, 1922)
 Evaniella clara (Frison, 1922)
 Evaniella compressa (Fabricius, 1804)
 Evaniella concolor (Taschenberg, 1891)
 Evaniella crassicornis (Kieffer, 1911)
 Evaniella curvipes (Taschenberg, 1891)
 Evaniella delicata (Frison, 1922)
 Evaniella dichela (Kieffer, 1910)
 Evaniella dichronyx (Kieffer, 1910)
 Evaniella dispersa (Schletterer, 1889)
 Evaniella ditoma (Kieffer, 1911)
 Evaniella eocenica Sawoniewicz & Kupryjanowicz, 2003
 Evaniella erythraspis (Cameron, 1911)
 Evaniella ferruginea (Kieffer, 1904)
 Evaniella ferruginescens (Schletterer, 1889)
 Evaniella flagellata (Schletterer, 1889)
 Evaniella gemina (Schletterer, 1889)
 Evaniella haarupi (Cameron, 1909)
 Evaniella haenschi (Enderlein, 1901)
 Evaniella hoffmannsi (Enderlein, 1909)
 Evaniella huebneri (Roman, 1917)
 Evaniella isomera (Kieffer, 1910)
 Evaniella latidens (Kieffer, 1910)
 Evaniella levigena (Kieffer, 1904)
 Evaniella luculenta (Frison, 1922)
 Evaniella macrochela (Kieffer, 1910)
 Evaniella maximiliani (Schletterer, 1886)
 Evaniella mendozaensis (Cameron, 1909)
 Evaniella microthorax (Kieffer, 1910)
 Evaniella miniacea (Enderlein, 1905)
 Evaniella minor (Schletterer, 1886)
 Evaniella montivaga (Kieffer, 1910)
 Evaniella mystica (Frison, 1922)
 Evaniella nana (Schletterer, 1889)
 Evaniella neomexicana (Ashmead, 1901)
 Evaniella nigricornis (Fabricius, 1804)
 Evaniella nobilis (Westwood, 1851)
 Evaniella oreas (Kieffer, 1911)
 Evaniella ornaticornis (Cameron, 1887)
 Evaniella parvidens (Kieffer, 1910)
 Evaniella planiceps (Kieffer, 1910)
 Evaniella polita (Schletterer, 1889)
 Evaniella psilopsis (Kieffer, 1911)
 Evaniella pulcherrima (Szépligeti, 1903)
 Evaniella rhopalocera (Kieffer, 1910)
 Evaniella robusta (Schletterer, 1889)
 Evaniella rufa (Taschenberg, 1891)
 Evaniella ruficaput (Dewitz, 1881)
 Evaniella ruficornis (Fabricius, 1804)
 Evaniella rufidorsum (Szépligeti, 1903)
 Evaniella rufonotata (Kieffer, 1904)
 Evaniella rufosparsa (Kieffer, 1911)
 Evaniella rugifrons (Cameron, 1887)
 Evaniella semaeoda (Bradley, 1908)
 Evaniella semirubra (Cresson, 1865)
 Evaniella signata (Schletterer, 1889)
 Evaniella tarsalis (Schletterer, 1889)
 Evaniella tomentella (Kieffer, 1904)
 Evaniella tractigena (Kieffer, 1910)
 Evaniella trochanterata (Cameron, 1887)
 Evaniella varicornis (Cameron, 1887)

References

Further reading

 

Evanioidea
Articles created by Qbugbot
Hymenoptera genera